Thomas Beach (born December 3, 1974) is an American real estate agent and politician who is currently serving as a member of the South Carolina House of Representatives from the 10th district.

Early life and career
Born in Colorado, Beach joined the United States Army in 1994 and served until 1998. He served with the 75th Ranger Regiment, the 2nd Infantry Division, and the 25th Infantry Division. Beach is a Real estate agent in Upstate South Carolina.

Political career 
Beach ran won the June 2022 Republican primary and ran unopposed in the general election. He succeeded West Cox on December 6, 2022. 

Beach serves on the House Medical, Military, Public and Municipal Affairs Committee. He is a member of the South Carolina Freedom Caucus.

In 2023, Beach was one of 21 Republican co-sponsors of the South Carolina Prenatal Equal Protection Act of 2023, which would make women who had abortions eligible for the death penalty.

References

Living people
1974 births
People from Delta, Colorado
University of Alabama alumni
2022 South Carolina elections
South Carolina House of Representatives elections
Members of the South Carolina General Assembly
Republican Party members of the South Carolina House of Representatives
Military personnel from Colorado